RJM may refer to:

Rastriya Janamorcha, Nepali political party
Religious of Jesus and Mary, a Roman Catholic religious congregation of women
River Jones Music, American record label based in Phoenix, Arizona
Russel John Matic, stem-modesty, jkb’s crush